Causers of This is the debut album from the artist Toro y Moi, released on January 4, 2010, on Carpark Records.

Reception 

Causers of This received generally positive reviews, Metacritic reports a rating of 71% based on 18 critical reviews.

Pitchforks Joe Colly stated that "Bundick embraces a cleaner and mellower sound that's more indebted to hip-hop. He wears his inspirations proudly, and throughout there's a clear nod to producers like J Dilla and Flying Lotus."

Indie Shuffle's Jason Grishkoff noted that "[Causers of This] will slot comfortably into your record collection next to contemporaries such as Small Black, Washed Out, Gold Panda and Neon Indian – artists from all around the world who, intended or not, are coming out with markedly similar musical results."

The album is noted to have had a large impact on music in South Carolina over the decade following its release, as the state had previously been known mainly for country and roots rock.

Track listing

Legacy 

Artist such as Trinidad James, Friendly Fires, Marcus Orelias, Robb Bank$, Skizzy Mars and more have sampled Causers of This.

References 

2010 debut albums
Carpark Records albums
Toro y Moi albums